Lillian Knight may refer to:

 Lillian Knight (born 1883) (1883–1946),  American western star and silent film actress
 Lillian Knight (silent film actress), American actress who appeared in silent films